"Let It Go" is a song from Disney's 2013 animated feature film Frozen.

Let It Go may also refer to:

Music

Albums
Let It Go (The Clarks album) or the title song, 2000
Let It Go (Galactic Cowboys album), 2000
Let It Go (House Shoes album) or the title song, 2012
Let It Go (Josh Nelson album) or the title track, 2007
Let It Go (Stanley Turrentine album) or the title track, 1966
Let It Go (State Radio album) or the title song, 2009
Let It Go (Tim McGraw album) or the title song (see below), 2007
Let It Go (Will Young album) or the title song (see below), 2008
Let It Go, by Clair Marlo, 1989
Let It Go, by The Infamous Stringdusters, 2014
Let It Go, by Norman Brown, 2017

EPs
Let It Go (EP), by Heo Young Saeng, 2011
Let It Go, or the title song (see below), by James Bay, 2014

Songs
"Let It Go" (Alexandra Burke song), 2012
"Let It Go" (Anna Rossinelli song), 2013
"Let It Go" (Brit & Alex song), 2008
"Let It Go" (Def Leppard song), 1981
"Let It Go" (Devlin song), 2011
"Let It Go" (DJ Khaled song), 2021
"Let It Go" (Dragonette song), 2012
"Let It Go!", by F.T. Island, 2011
"Let It Go" (Fe song), 2013
"Let It Go" (George Strait song), 2015
"Let It Go" (Jacky Cheung song), 2010
"Let It Go" (James Bay song), 2014
"Let It Go" (Keyshia Cole song), 2007
"Let It Go" (Ray J song), 1997
"Let It Go" (Tim McGraw song), 2008
"Let It Go" (Will Young song), 2009
"Let It Go" (Wiz Khalifa song), 2012
"Letitgo", by Prince, 1994
"Let It Go", by Ai featuring Snoop Dogg from The Last Ai, 2010
"Let It Go", by Alesha Dixon from Fired Up, 2006
"Let It Go", by A$AP Ferg from Trap Lord, 2013
"Let It Go", by the Bangles from Different Light, 1986
"Let It Go", by the Boxer Rebellion from Ocean by Ocean, 2016
"Let It Go", by Cavo from Bright Nights Dark Days, 2009
"Let It Go", by Cormega from Legal Hustle, 2004
"Let It Go", by Courtney Barnett and Kurt Vile from Lotta Sea Lice, 2017
"Let It Go", by Day26, 2011
"Let It Go", by Dirty South, 2007
"Let It Go", by Dissident Prophet from We're Not Grasshoppers, 1996
"Let It Go", by Floor Thirteen from Mmmm!, 2008
"Let It Go", by Grace Slick from Dreams, 1980
"Let It Go", by the Grass Roots from More Golden Grass, 1970
"Let It Go", by Great Big Sea from Something Beautiful*, 2004
"Let It Go", by Hideki Naganuma from the video game Ollie King, 2004
"Let It Go", by KC and the Sunshine Band from KC and the Sunshine Band, 1975
”Let It Go”, by Kevin Gates from I'm Him, 2019
"Let It Go", by Kirk Franklin from Hero, 2005
"Let It Go", by Krokus from Heart Attack, 1988
"Let It Go", by Loudness from Lightning Strikes, 1986
"Let It Go", by Luba from Secrets and Sins, 1984
"Let It Go", by Melissa O'Neil from Melissa O'Neil, 2005
"Let It Go", by Mitchel Musso and Tiffany Thornton from Hatching Pete, 2009
"Let It Go", by the Neighbourhood from I Love You, 2013
"Let It Go", by Nick Carter, the theme song for House of Carters, 2006
"Let It Go", by Paco from This Is Where We Live, 2004
"Let It Go", by Playboi Carti from Playboi Carti, 2017
"Let It Go", by R3hab, 2018
"Let It Go", by Scatman John from Everybody Jam!, 1996
"Let It Go", by Shinhwa from The Return, 2012
"Let It Go", by Stooshe, 2016
"Let It Go", by the Story So Far from Proper Dose, 2018
"Let It Go", by Summer Walker from Life on Earth, 2020
"Let It Go", by Toto from Falling in Between, 2006
"Let It Go", by Yuna Ito from Love: Singles Best 2005–2010, 2009
"Let It Go (Lil Mama)", by Nelly from Brass Knuckles, 2008
"Let It Go", from the Broadway musical The Full Monty, 2000

Television
"Let It Go" (The Bill Engvall Show), an episode
"Let It Go" (Men of a Certain Age), an episode
"Let It Go" (Private Practice), an episode
Let It Go, a rejected 2012 sitcom pilot starring Zachary Levi

Other uses
Let It Go, a comedy album and DVD by Bill Burr, 2010
Let It Go, a book by T. D. Jakes, 2012

See also
Let Go (disambiguation)
Let It All Go (disambiguation)
Let Her Go (disambiguation)
Let's Go (disambiguation)
Letting Go (disambiguation)